The Lewis Brick Block, also known as the Stingaree Hotel, is an historic structure located at 538 5th Avenue in the Gaslamp Quarter, San Diego, in the U.S. state of California. It was built in 1887.

See also
 List of Gaslamp Quarter historic buildings

External links

 

1887 establishments in California
Buildings and structures completed in 1887
Buildings and structures in San Diego
Gaslamp Quarter, San Diego